The La Salle Explorers men's basketball program represents La Salle University in college basketball.

Rivalries
The Explorers, a member of the Big 5, have long-standing rivalries with multiple institutions including Temple University, University of Pennsylvania, Saint Joseph's University, and Villanova University. Another major rival is Drexel University who is a member of the City 6.

History
The program has been rated the 53rd "Greatest College Basketball Program of All-Time" by Street & Smith's magazine and 71st by the ESPN College Basketball Encyclopedia.

La Salle has won one National Championship, one National Invitation Tournament Championship, and advanced to two Final Fours.  The Explorers have also made 12 NCAA Tournament appearances, won eight Philadelphia Big 5 city championships, and four Metro Atlantic Athletic Conference Championships.  The program is one of only two schools (with Houston) to have two players in the top 25 in all-time NCAA scoring – Lionel Simmons and Michael Brooks.  It's also had three National Players of the Year.

Postseason

NCAA tournament results
The Explorers have appeared in the NCAA tournament 12 times. Their combined record is 14–11. They were National Champions in 1954 and National Finalists in 1955.

NIT results
The Explorers have appeared in the National Invitation Tournament (NIT) 12 times. Their combined record is 9–11. They were NIT champions in 1952, when the tournament was considered an elite event.

Explorers in the NBA
La Salle has an extensive history of players who played professional basketball, including:
Michael Brooks, 1980 College Player of the Year
Joe Bryant, father of former pro Kobe Bryant
Rasual Butler
Larry Cannon
Ken Durrett
Bobby Fields
Larry Foust, eight-time NBA All-Star selection 
Tom Gola, Naismith Hall of Fame, 1955 College Player of the Year
B. J. Johnson
Tim Legler, current basketball analyst for ESPN, 4th all-time in NBA three-point shooting percentage
Ralph Lewis
Gary Neal
Doug Overton
Jim Phelan
Lionel Simmons, 1990 College Player of the Year
Steven Smith
Fatty Taylor
Randy Woods
 Bernie Williams

Explorers in international leagues

Stephen Zack (born 1992), basketball player for Hapoel Holon in the Israeli Basketball Premier League

Retired numbers

La Salle has retired four jersey numbers:

Coaches

Previous head coach Dr. John Giannini previously coached at Rowan College, where he won the NCAA Division III national championship in 1996, and the University of Maine, where he left with the Black Bears' best winning percentage in school history.

On April 8, 2018, La Salle announced Ashley Howard as the next head coach of the Explorers. Howard previously served as an assistant coach under Jay Wright at Villanova University. As assistant coach, he helped lead the Wildcats to two NCAA Division 1 basketball championships. After four losing seasons at La Salle, Howard was fired.

On April 5, 2022, The Philadelphia Inquirer reported that the La Salle would hire Fran Dunphy to be the Explorer's next men's basketball coach.

Year-by-Year Records

References

External links